Poiana Mare is a commune in Dolj County, Oltenia, Romania with a population of 10,740 (2011). It is composed of three villages: Poiana Mare, Tunarii Noi and Tunarii Vechi.

References

Communes in Dolj County
Localities in Oltenia